Zlata Yuryevna Chochieva (born 1 March 1985 in Moscow), is a Russian pianist of Ossetian origin.

Life and career 
At the age of 4 she started piano lessons at the Children's Music School "Yakov Vladimirovich Flier" in the class of N. A. Dolenko. In 2000 she continued her education at the Central Music School of the Moscow Conservatory. There she studied in the class of Kira Shashkina under the direction of Mikhail Pletnev.

In 2005, she became the youngest artist ever to receive the "Honored Artist of the Republic of North Ossetia-Alania" award.

In 2008, she graduated from the Moscow Conservatory with honors in the classes of Pavel Nersessian, Oleksandr Bondurianskyi, and N. A. Rubinstein (chamber ensemble), and completed her postgraduate studies in 2012. She was participating in master classes with pianists Pavel Gililov, Pascal Devoyon, Dmitri Bashkirov, Paul Badura-Skoda, Abdel Rahman El Bacha, Jerome Lowenthal, and Stephen Kovacevich. From 2012 to 2014 she studied at the Graduate School at the Mozarteum in Salzburg in the class of Professor Jacques Rouvier, who appointed her as his assistant in 2013.

She has been living in Berlin since October 2019.

Concert activities 
Chochieva first performed in public at the age of 5. At the age of 8, she first appeared with the orchestra on the stage of the Great Hall of the Moscow Conservatory with a Mozart concerto. Since then, she has given concerts in the Herkulessaal (Munich), Concertgebouw (Amsterdam), Teatro La Fenice (Venice), Tivoli Concert Hall (Copenhagen), Casa da Música (Porto), Centro Cultural de Belém (Lisbon), Broward Center for the Performing Arts (Florida), Tchaikovsky Concert Hall (Moscow), in the large hall of the Moscow Conservatory and in the Saint Petersburg Philharmonia.

She played with the Russian National Orchestra, the State Academic Symphony Orchestra of the Russian Federation, the Copenhagen Philharmonic, the Orchestre Royal de Chambre de Wallonie, the Slovak Radio Symphony Orchestra, the Orchestre Philharmonique de Nice, as well as with the  Münchener Kammerorchester. She performed with conductors such as Terje Mikkelsen, Mikhail Pletnev, Vladimir Spivakov, Simon Gaudenz, Tugan Sokhiev, Marek Pijarowski, Paul Goodwin, Karl-Heinz Steffens and Gintaras Rinkevičius.

Chochieva has been invited to important international music festivals such as the Miami International Piano Festival, the Gilmore Keyboard Festival (being the  "Gilmore Rising Star" in the season 2017–2018), the festival «Progetto Martha Argerich» at Lugano, to the Lucerne Festival as well as to the Berliner Klavierfestival. In 2018 she established a new International piano Festival at the Ivanovka estate jointly with the pianist Misha Dacic.

Discography 
 2012: Rachmaninoff: Chopin Variations and Piano Sonata, Piano Classics
 2014: Chopin, Études Complete, Piano Classics
 2015: Rachmaninoff: Etudes-tableaux (complete), Piano Classics
 2021: (re)creations: Piano transcriptions by Rachmaninoff, Liszt, Friedman, ACCENTUS Music
 2022: Chiaroscuro: Mozart & Scriabin, Naïve

Honours and awards 
 1993: 1st prize of the competition for the best performance of a concerto with an orchestra (Moscow)
 1994: 1st prize of the First All-Russian Competition named after M. I. Glinka (Moscow)
 1995: Grand Prix of the Yakov Flier Festival (Moscow)
 1996: 1st prize of the International Piano Competition in Naples (Italy)
 1996: Laureate and winner of a special prize for the best performance of Scriabin's works at the International Festival named after him (Moscow)
 1999: Gold Medal of the International Piano Competition in Copenhagen (Denmark)
 2005: 2nd prize (first prize not awarded) of the Szymanowski International Competition named after him (Łódź)
 2005: 1st prize at the Frechilla-Zuloaga International Competition in Spain (Valladolid)
 2006: 3rd prize at the Tivoli Piano Competition (Copenhagen)
 2006: Special Prize of the Mozart Society Munich at the ARD International Music Competition (Germany)
 2008: 1st prize at the International Competition for Contemporary Chamber Music in Krakow with the Messiaen Quartet (Krakow, Poland) 
 2009: 1st prize of the International Chamber Music Competition "Cidade de Alcobaca" with the Messiaen Quartet (Portugal)
 2010: 1st prize of the International Piano Competition "Guido Alberto Fano" (Camposampiero)
 2010: silver medal, award for the best performance of Chopin's works and audience prize of the Santa Catarina International Piano Competition (Brazil, 2010)

In 2019 and 2021 she is a member of the jury of the International Piano Competition in Aarhus.

References

Literature 
"Who's that girl?", Interview with Zlata Chochieva, Pianist Magazine Nr. 114, 2020

External links 
 Webseite of Zlata Chochieva
 Interview with Zlata Chochieva

Russian women pianists
Russian classical pianists
1985 births
Living people
Russian people of Ossetian descent